Gravida: National Centre for Growth and Development is a New Zealand government-funded Centre of Research Excellence (CoRE). CoREs are inter-institutional, multi-disciplinary research networks that are tasked with facilitating collaborative research on topics of strategic interest.

History
Gravida was originally set up under the name of the National Research Centre for Growth and Development (NRCGD) in 2003 and was initially headed by Professor Sir Peter Gluckman. The name was changed from NRCGD to Gravida in November 2012.

Main areas of research
The organisation is focused on funding research into epigenetics, phenotypic plasticity, physiology, medicine, and evolutionary medicine. 
The main research question is how environmental influences such as nutrition and maternal weight, before, during and shortly after pregnancy can alter the way humans and animals develop. The aim is to translate research findings into better health for the community, as well as into increased agricultural productivity.

Members
Gravida provides research funding to researchers within the following ‘member organisations’:
Massey University,
 The University of Otago,
 The University of Canterbury,
 AgResearch Limited, 
 Landcorp Farming,
 The University of Auckland.
The organisation is hosted by the University of Auckland, New Zealand.

Membership
Gravida is a member of the Association of Centres of Research Excellence (aCoRE), NZ.

Funding
Gravida, and the other CoREs, are funded by the New Zealand government through the Tertiary Education Commission. Funding is allocated through a competitive funding round that takes place every 6 years.

References

External links
 
 Association of Centres of Research Excellence, NZ
 Tertiary Education Commission, Centres of Research Excellence, NZ

Scientific organisations based in New Zealand
Organizations established in 2003
Organisations based in Auckland
Research in New Zealand